Abbas Bolaghi (also Romanized as ‘Abbās Bolāghī; also known as ‘Abbās Bolāgh) is a village in Bastam Rural District, in the Central District of Chaypareh County, West Azerbaijan Province, Iran. At the 2006 census, its population was 84, in 19 families.

References 

Populated places in Chaypareh County